was a Japanese voice actress who worked for 81 Produce. She was born in Tokyo, Japan.

Filmography
Glass Mask (TV 2005) (Art director (ep.5))
Maison Ikkoku (Principal of Wakaba nursery school (ep.93))
Robot Carnival (movie) (Grandma (presence))

External links

1935 births
81 Produce voice actors
Japanese voice actresses
2015 deaths